The Flint Creek Range,  el. , is a mountain range northeast of Philipsburg, Montana in Granite County, Montana. The highest point in the range is Mount Powell, at 10,168 ft. in elevation.

About 60,000 acres of the Flints are roadless. From Deer Lodge, Montana, there appears to be a level, barren ridge connecting Mount Powell and Deer Lodge Mountain, el. 9765 ft. However, if one is traveling eastbound on Interstate 90, in the stretch between Drummond and Garrison, Montana, looking up one can see that this ridge is actually a sheer cliff called "The Crater." The Crater is characterized as "[g]iant granite ribs resembling the backbone of a dinosaur" by Cunningham. The Flints have the typical Rocky Mountain fauna, including a few mountain goats. The area is popular for hunting of deer, elk, and blue grouse, but otherwise appears to receive little recreational use. Dozens of alpine lakes in the range provide good fishing.

The Discovery Ski Area is located in the southwestern part of the Flints, near Georgetown Lake.

See also
 List of mountain ranges in Montana

Notes

Ranges of the Rocky Mountains
Mountain ranges of Montana
Landforms of Granite County, Montana